Sir William Magnay, 2nd Baronet (1855 – 8 January 1917) was an English baronet and novelist.

Magnay was a son of Sir William Magnay, 1st Baronet who was Lord Mayor of London. He succeeded to the baronetcy in 1871. He was a prolific novelist, and published twenty-five novels before his death; a further three were brought out posthumously.

Magnay married in 1879, and was himself succeeded by his son Christopher Magnay, born 1884.

Works
Magnay's publications included:
The Red Chancellor
Poached Peerage
Honi Soit: an Original Play in Four Acts (1887)
The Fall of a Star, a novel (1897)
The Heiress of the Season  (1899)
Count Zarka; a Romance (1903)
A Prince of Lovers; a Romance (1905)
The Master Spirit (1906)
The Amazing Duke : a Romance (1907)
The Players: a Tragi-comedy (1913)
The Hunt Ball Mystery (1918)

Arms

References

Obituary: p. 152, The Annual Register: a review of public events at home and abroad, for the year 1917. London: Longmans, Green and Co. 1918.
p. 387, The Peerage, Baronetage and Knightage, of Great Britain and Ireland, for 1860: by Robert Dod. London: Whitaker and Co., 1860.
List of mystery novels at Mystery*File.

External links
 
 

1855 births
1917 deaths
Baronets in the Baronetage of the United Kingdom
19th-century English novelists
20th-century English novelists
English male novelists
19th-century English male writers
20th-century English male writers